"Runaway" is a song by American rapper Kanye West featuring fellow American rapper Pusha T, released as the second single from the former's fifth studio album, My Beautiful Dark Twisted Fantasy (2010). The song was written by the artists alongside Malik Yusef,  Emile, Jeff Bhasker, and Mike Dean, with the latter three co-producing it with West. The composition features repetitive piano riffs, intricate samples and a production style with several similarities to West's album 808s & Heartbreak (2008). Described as a deeply personal song in nature, it expresses West's thoughts on his failed relationships, and his acceptance of the media's perception of him. Lyrically, the song explores criticism aimed at West in the past and serves as a "toast to the douchebags."

Before the song's premiere at the 2010 MTV Video Music Awards, it generated substantial public interest due to what had happened the year prior at the 2009 MTV Video Music Awards. West's performance at its premiere received positive reviews, with the full song being released online on October 4, 2010. The song itself received universal acclaim from music critics and was listed amongst the best songs of the year by several publications, including MTV, Pitchfork, Rolling Stone, Complex, New York Post, amongst others. Critics praised the song for its sincere subject matter, the openness of the song, and the soulful, clean production. The song quickly became one of the best-reviewed singles and is considered a tour-de-force by West, who was then considered to be at the peak of his powers. Critics noted that the track solidified West's commercial comeback with the public. The song has since appeared on multiple decade-end and all-time lists as one of the greatest songs of all time, including at number 25 on Rolling Stone's list of The 500 Greatest Songs of All Time in 2021.

The song debuted and peaked on the Billboard Hot 100 at position 12 and is the centerpiece of Runaway, a 35-minute short film featuring the majority of songs from My Beautiful Dark Twisted Fantasy. The song's nearly ten-minute music video features ballet dancers performing elaborate choreography. The music video received mostly positive reviews from music critics, who praised the scope of the video, the degree of creativity and the production design.

Background and development

Recording 
Some of the inspiration of the song was derived from various media controversies, including West's interruption of recording artist Taylor Swift at the 2009 MTV Video Music Awards during her acceptance speech. The controversy caused West to exile himself to Oahu, Hawaii and record his fifth studio album mostly in a reclusive nature, shying away from collaborating with artists he wasn't personally close to. Like the majority of My Beautiful Dark Twisted Fantasy, "Runaway" was produced there. Amongst the various artists invited down to Hawaii to record songs for the album was Pusha T, a rapper known for the hip-hop duo Clipse.

According to Pusha T, the song was recorded in either March or April 2010. Most of the recording crew on the project had forgotten and or forgiven West for the incident with Swift, including Pusha T, who described the event as "old news". By the time Pusha T was supposed to record his verse for the song, West had already recorded a majority of the song. Pusha T had to record his verse several times, because West didn't think Pusha T was being mean enough for the concept of the song the first few times. Pusha T commented that re-doing a verse was something he very rarely did. Generally, Pusha T would write his verses very quickly, and noted that he made the exception for West who he had described as a perfectionist. During the recording process, the two had collaborated on several songs together. Pusha T called the recording process of the song "interesting", and stated:

We recorded quite a few songs. He had the record already and was like, 'Yo, I want you on this record.' A lot of stuff from him comes from conversation. He'll talk to you and get a feel for your perspective and your outlook on shit. And later, he'll be like, 'Yo, I want you on this. I got a record that that perspective would fit on.' That's how he operates. [...] You will find yourself explaining yourself, and if you can't explain the reasoning behind the things you're saying in a verse or whatever the case may be, it might not fly. He won't let you get away with it.

West was so impressed with Pusha-T's performance while recording "Runaway" that he signed him under his own personal label. About his portion of the song, West stated that he was interested in making a song that the average person could relate to, as he perceived himself as someone who identified with the average person. West mused that when writing the song he intended some parts of the song as a double entendre. According to West, some portions of the song sound like West is commenting about his relationship with a girl, when he is also talking about his relationship with the media and society. He mused, "I like leaving songs ambiguous a little bit, where it’s like, it could be about other people, It could be about yourself." The song was called an "anthem for both men and women" by him, who stated he wanted both genders to be able to relate to the song. He summarized the song as a "toast for the douchebags".

While some of the inspiration for the song was drawn from the incident with Swift, it was noted that the song was not an apology. On his Twitter account, West commented that he had written a "beautiful" song for her, noting "if she won't take it then I'll perform it for her." Lawrence Dong was another artist who West had called down to Hawaii.  Some of the drumming pattern featured on the song were sampled from "Expo 83" performed by the Backyard Heavies and written by John Roger Branch; the same drums used on "The Basement" from Pete Rock's album Mecca and the Soul Brother.

Production

When speaking with Complex, producer Emile Haynie recounted the recording session "It was late one night, and we were hanging out, and Kanye asked me if I had any beats, and I started playing him some beats. Pretty low, no big deal, we were just chilling playing some beats. I didn't know if I had anything that great, because his album's production was coming out so fucking next level. I had some beats, but I was already in the process of working on songs from scratch, but I was like, 'Yeah I got some stuff, I'll play you some ideas.'" Haynie continued "I had a beat, and I played it, and it was the foundation of 'Runaway'. It was pretty different from the production now, but something about it, the chord progression or the way I put together the chords must've rung out to him. It was pretty amazing to watch. He heard the beat once, then asked the guy to play it one more time, and then was just like, 'Okay, put it in Pro Tools.' And when he said that, the room was like, 'Oh shit.' Jeff Bhasker and Kanye West really went in on the production. I was upstairs doing Cudi's thing, and I just kept hearing the song just get better and better and better. Kanye is a super producer in the truest sense of the word. He turned it into the this epic song. He probably had listened to the beat for four minutes, and got in the booth, and almost verbatim to what's on the song today, just did it. I don't know if he wrote it in his head in those four minutes, but he just got in the booth and was like, 'Yeah I always find, yeah I always find somethin' wrong.' And almost the whole song just came out. Something about the chords and the way the music worked, I don't know, it just hit him and worked out perfectly. The lyrics and the concept were what they were, and that's when the Kanye West genius producer mode came in to play. He totally reproduced the record, and kept working on it and working on it, along with Jeff Bhasker, who played the piano line and played a lot of the keys on it. He's one of my favorite producers too. It's just a beautiful record. It’s a masterpiece. He always is like, 'Thank you for 'Runaway'. Thank you for sparking that.' He's very cool about that. He's very appreciative. I'm like, 'Dude, you're the one who made it this amazing record! Thank you for making my beat, that was pretty good, into this amazing song! [Laughs].'"

Cover art 
The original cover art for "Runaway" is a photograph by contemporary visual artist George Condo of a ballerina. Condo produced two different promotional artworks, and also produced the cover artwork for My Beautiful Dark Twisted Fantasy and several of its singles. On October 1, 2010, West released a newer cover art for "Runaway" which is a painting also by Condo of a ballerina. On October 4, 2010, the song was released onto the iTunes Store as the album's second single. The website uses the original photograph cover art.

Composition

According to Troy L. Smith of Cleveland.com, "Runaway" can be described as a progressive rap production comprising layers of varied musical elements, including pop, dance, R&B, trip hop, and art rock. The song begins with a sparse, isolated sounding piano melody that initially repeats one note during the start of the song. After about a minute and a half, West provides his first verse. West sings "you’ve been putting up with my shit just way too long," before launching into the ironic chorus of "let's have a toast for the douchebags". A vocal sample of "Look at ya! Look at ya!" is also heard throughout the first half of the song, excerpted from a 1981 recording of Rick James performing in Long Beach, California. West begs his girlfriend to "run away" from his destructive behavior, warning her of further behavior, while also dwelling on his own intimacy issues. The piano chord that introduces the song continues on, but the production then introduces a forceful cello and a light string section.  The second verse is delivered by Pusha T who is used as a juxtaposition against West; whereas West is heartfelt and sincere towards his girlfriend, Pusha T is rude towards his lover, a side of his personality which West wanted him to personify for the song.

During a concluding reprise of the chorus and the opening melody, West ends the song with a three-minute outro of vocoded and overdriven wordless singing accompanied by string sections harmonizing with his vocals. It briefly begins with West speaking, usually transcribed as "I'ma be honest", before he begins singing, and the vocal effects drown out what is audible in his words. Allmusic editor Andy Kellman was favorable to the outro, saying that "West blows into a device and comes out sounding something like a muffled, bristly version of Robert Fripp's guitar." Slant Magazine's Matthew Cole interpreted the purpose of the outro as a "fantasy of escape through pure catharsis, with the vocoder literalizing Kanye's ability to transform his personal shortcomings into art." Chicago Tribune writer Greg Kot described the production of the song in detail, writing:

"Ostensibly sung by a groom to his new bride at a wedding, the song plays as an apology, a warning and a defiant manifesto. The music mirrors that complexity. A midtempo funky-drummer beat glides underneath the melancholy, reverberating piano notes, while a deep, mushrooming bass tone threatens to swallow everything. Brusque cello strokes contrast with elegiac violins, while a dirty guitar wends through the string section like a drunk, knocking over music stands and splattering mud on the white-tablecloth beauty. It’s a turbulent combination of sounds: brooding and chastened in the verses, oddly triumphant and darkly humorous during the choruses." 

The outro has been interpreted as commentary on how West had, at the time, attempted to speak directly on his feelings and opinions, but was unable to do so under the pressure of media sensationalism. Another interpretation was proposed by Chicago Sun-Times writer Thomas Conner, who wrote "the last four minutes find him humming and singing, but his voice is Auto-Tuned and distorted beyond perceptibility. What's he saying or singing? Can't really make it out, can't really understand him. Which, no doubt, is how he feels his clumsy public statements are often received."

Reception

Critical response

"Runaway" was lauded and received universal acclaim from music critics, and is considered by many to be West's best song. Slant Magazine's Matthew Cole described the song as West's greatest showcase as a writer. Cole stated that the song was deeply personal in nature, viewing it as an agonizing portrait of a man "trying to exit the black hole of his own implacable ego." Entertainment Weeklys Simon Vozick-Levinson stated that the song was a successful case of self-reflection lyrically, writing that it "casts the excesses around it in a new light. West may be obnoxious, but at least he’s interested in confronting those aspects of his identity through his music. Few stars of comparable wattage would dare do the same." Pitchfork Media's Ryan Dombal commented that it was one of West's best songs, describing it as funny, sad and relatable. Dombal mused that with the song, he "rousingly highlights his own douchebaggery, turning it into a rallying cry for all humanity" and described the vocal manipulation towards the end as sounding like a "dying cyborg". Another writer for Pitchfork, Tom Breihan, dubbed the track 'Best New Music' and was surprised with what he perceived to be West's growth as a writer, reporting "as the VMA moment fades into the rearview, 'Runaway' is able to stand as just that: a song, and a seriously goddam good one at that".

Thomas Conner of the Chicago Sun-Times cited the song as the thesis statement to the rest of the album, calling it "epic" and musing that West's "difficulty in communicating makes him a menace in the real world, but it's pretty compelling on record." Jonah Weiner of Slate viewed that the three minute conclusion of the song was the most arresting moments on My Beautiful Dark Twisted Fantasy. Chris Martins of Spin called the song a piano driven epic, and noted that there was only one way to "interpret the early message sent by 'Runaway': he was calling himself an asshole". IGN's Chad Grischow, felt that the three minute conclusion was over-long, but commented that with the "icy chill of the piano and naked beat sound fantastic" while also calling the production soaring.

Kitty Empire of The Guardian complimented the scope of the track, stating "taking things to the next level is one of hip-hop's great cliches, an achievement that West can comfortably claim. Being both a hero and something of a jackass all at the same time? That's another thing entirely." Rolling Stone writer Rob Sheffield praised the ending of the song, writing that it came up at a point of the song when the song has already "sealed itself in your brain", summarizing that "there’s no way it should work, but it keeps rolling for three more minutes without breaking the spell." David Browne of Time stated that the song, much like "Lost in the World", feature "shimmering soundscapes that pinpoint a common ground between the hardness of hip-hop and the sweetness of indie rock."

Sputnikmusic's Channing Freeman viewed that while the album featured a number of songs longer than five minutes in duration, "they all feel incredibly lean and devoid of bullshit". Freeman stated that the track primarily "slides right by because of its gorgeous beat and Kanye's excellent vocals (808s-style singing sans autotune plus laid-back rapping), and the instrumental second half of the song is beautiful." HipHopDX writer complimented the track, calling it an "anthem", writing that it contained some of West's simplest and most melodic production. AbsolutePunk's Drew Beringer reported that track embodied the "electronic melancholy of 808s & Heartbreak" and cited the song as an example of the grandiose song composition featured on the album. Andrew Barber of Complex called the song a "centerpiece", describing it as "Kanye’s toast to all the douchebags, assholes and scumbags resonated with even the biggest Kanye haters, putting the Louis Vuitton Don back in the world’s good graces." Kyle Anderson of MTV News proposed that the song was the best single of West's career, writing "but there's something about 'Runaway' that makes it feel just a little bit more special, like it could really end up in the pantheon of great hip-hop moments".

"Runaway" was included in a number of end of 2010 lists. Rolling Stone named "Runaway" the best song of 2010, commenting that it was "Kanye's musical response to the Taylor Swift affair, but it's much more than that: a nine-minute meditation on romantic failure and public infamy. Kanye creates a huge, eerie beat out of thunderous drums and plinking piano." They ended the article with the comment, "in 2010, no other song was so crazily epic or jaw-droppingly gorgeous — not on the radio, not anywhere." Kyle Anderson, writing for MTV, named it the 2nd Best Song of 2010, stating that the track began with a "haunting single tap of a piano key, kicking off one of the most epic, jaw-dropping, honest and thrilling pieces of music to hit the popular airwaves all year". Pitchfork Media named it the second-best song of 2010 stating that "Runaway" puts "Kanye's contradictory impulses on full display like they're some immaculate museum exhibit. At nine minutes, it is My Beautiful Dark Twisted Fantasys longest song, but also its simplest and most emotionally direct [...] 'Runaway' marks the rare moment where Kanye sides with his detractors — if the whole world thinks he's a douchebag, well, this one time he's inclined to agree."

Insalul Ahmed of Complex placed the song at number two on their best of the year list, reporting that "most artists might have avoided making a song like this after something like Swiftgate. But that’s why we love [Kan]Ye: He doesn’t give a fuck." New York Post also named the song as the best of the year, musing "whether he’s self-deprecating or pulling the wool over our eyes, we can’t help running toward this talented bad boy when he tells us, 'Run away from me, baby'... Maybe it’s not his Beautiful Dark Twisted Fantasy, but ours. Rap Up listed the song as the fifth best of the year. In January 2011, The Village Voices Pazz & Jop annual critics' poll ranked "Runaway" at number four to find the best music of 2010; West's other singles "Power" and "Monster" were ranked at numbers five and six, respectively, on the same poll (their parent album My Beautiful Dark Twisted Fantasy was ranked as the best album on the poll as well). Beats Per Minute named "Runaway" the best song of 2010.

It is ranked number 25 on Rolling Stone'''s list of The 500 Greatest Songs of All Time.

Global critic aggregator Acclaimed Music ranks "Runaway" the 91st greatest song of all time and the 5th greatest song of the 2010s.

Commercial performance
While a significant critical success, "Runaway" performed less well commercially. During the week entering 12 October 2010, "Runaway" charted on the Billboard Hot 100 at number 12; named as the week's Hot Shot Debut. While the song attained a high debut, the song only remained there for one week, which was also the song's peak. It remained on the chart for a total of 13 weeks. On 4 September 2010, the single also debuted on the UK Singles Chart at position 75. It became a top 30 single on both the US Billboard Hot Rap Songs and Hot R&B/Hip-Hop Songs charts. In 2015, the ARIA certified the single Platinum in Australia for sales surpassing 70,000.

Live performances

The song was debuted during a live performance at the 2010 MTV Music Video Awards. Substantial media interest was generated with the performance, due to the controversy created the year prior by West. Prior to West's stage appearance, Swift performed a song called "Innocent" that some people perceived as a song about West. The performance began with West entering the stage by himself, walking over to a platform containing a MPC2000XL, an electronic musical instrument that allows for the player to program various samples into it. West began playing the song on the instrument, before a group of ballerinas entered the stage. The performance was accompanied by Pusha T, who delivered his verse. MTV failed to censor West's use of the word "asshole." West's performance received positive reviews and was described as a "comeback" moment. Time writer Claire Saddath graded his performance with an 'A+', and wrote that "it's hard to take a song that includes the lyrics 'Let's have a toast for the douche bags' seriously, but with this clean, honest execution, Kanye pulls it off." In 2017, Billboard placed it at eighth, on its list of "The 100 Greatest Award Show Performances of All Time".

West performed "Runaway" and "Power" on Saturday Night Live on October 2, 2010. For the first time in the show's history, the signature black instrument filled stage gave place to an all-white, backlit canvas. Pusha T joined West during the performance which featured the ballerinas that often accompanied West. HitFix's Gregory Ellwood praised the performance, though noted that his performance of "Power" was superior. Ellwood viewed that SNL was "very lucky to have him on such a weak overall show." Kevin O'Donnell of Spin wrote that West delivered one of the show's "most unique performances of all-time." West performed the song in an entirely red outfit.

During his set at the Coachella Valley Music and Arts Festival on April 17, 2011, West performed "Runaway" during the end of the performance. West's performance was described as "one of the most memorable performances in Coachella history." Todd Martens, critic for Los Angeles Times, described that the performance consisted of a "group of wayward ballerinas, seemingly caught in some sort of magnetic push and pull from the artist." During the 'Coke Live Musical Festival' in Poland, West performed the song with a 20 minute long freestyle. West performed the song the way he normally did, ending the performance with a continuous freestyle lasting 20 minutes in duration. One lone ballerina performed an interpretive dance during the entire duration of the freestyle. The song was often performed at the Watch the Throne Tour.

On December 9, 2021, West headlined a benefit concert at the Los Angeles Memorial Coliseum with fellow rapper Drake to raise clemency for Larry Hoover. During the solo portion of his set, West performed an emotional rendition of "Runaway", altering the outro's lyrics into a plea for his estranged wife, Kim Kardashian, to "run right back" to him.

Music video

Background and synopsis
The song became the basis for the short film Runaway. The film has four versions: the full-length film, a one minute-shorter clean version, the video version which is an excerpt of the film that matches the length of the song, and the extended video version which is nearly double the length of the video version. The video is a compilation of a total of nine songs featured on My Beautiful Dark Twisted Fantasy, with 10 of the 35 minutes of its running time devoted to a sequence featuring "Runaway". West drew inspiration from other long-form music videos and music related cinema, including Purple Rain, Pink Floyd The Wall and Michael Jackson's Thriller. West directed the video, drawing from director Stanley Kubrick as an inspiration. The film premiered on October 23, 2010. Model Selita Ebanks portrays the phoenix in the video. West's original intention was for Ebanks to be naked for the entirety of the video, but Ebanks refused.

The music video revolves around a love story between West (known as "Griffin" in the narrative) and a phoenix he discovers while driving through the woods. Griffin teaches her how to socialize with other people at first, and invites her to a dinner party. The other guests at the dinner party all react to Griffin's girlfriend with negative comments, that offends Griffin. An upset Griffin responds with a performance of "Runaway", backed by an interpretive dance sequence with ballerinas in black tutus, followed by a slow-motion sequence where lead dancers perform solos to a vocally distorted continuation of the song. The video ends with the phoenix bursting into flames with West frantically running into the forest. Nitsuh Abebe of New York offered an interpretation of the video, commenting:

In Runaway, the short film he released this fall, he uses a plinking piano to summon a ballet troupe, then sings about raising a toast to the douchebags and assholes of the world — in other words, he sticks a symbol of classical refinement next to a lyric about being toxic and acting ugly. (Ballet already does this, too: All that beauty is built on twisted toes, bloody shoes, deformed legs.) [...] He’s attracted to these symbols of classical refinement and aristocracy — ballet, golden goblets, 'Persian rugs with cherub imagery,' Greek mythology, next-level luxury brands — and then he sits among them reminding us that it doesn’t make him any different, or keep him from acting poisonous, or pissing the world off by grabbing people’s microphones. 

Reception
The music video was praised by Entertainment Weeklys Ken Tucker, calling it "a carefully modulated art-film made by a man on a mission", noting the usage of dominant colors as well as the imagery in the film. Jozen Cummings of The Wall Street Journal described the video as "a cross between an epic music video and a charming indie-house flick", stating that the greatest achievement of the video was how it "brought West's music to life". Will Dean of The Guardian called the video as a creative promotional tool, praising the video's scope and creativity, noting that it was "ridiculous, ostentatious and egotistical", citing that it fit perfectly into West's aesthetic. Rap-Up named it the best music video of 2010.

Nicole Jones of MTV Buzzworthy stated that the majority of the video was nonsensical and added up to little coherently, but wrote that regardless of its true meaning, the video was "really pretty to watch, the music is great, and it reminds us once again why there is only one Mr. West." Jorge Cullar offered a less favorable opinion of the video, stating that the video failed to be coherent, because West didn't have the "creative polymath capable of combining disparate elements like those exemplified by the cunning of a Picasso, the deconstruction of a Derrida, the creativity of a Warhol, or the glam avant-garde of David Bowie". Clair Saddath of Time listed the video amongst the best of all time. The video was nominated for Video of the Year at the BET Awards of 2011, and West was nominated for Director of the Year. As of January 2015, Billboard named the video as one of the 20 best of the 2010s (so far). NME listed it as the fourth best video of the decade in 2014.

"Runaway" appeared on several best music videos of the decade list's in 2019; Screen Rant named it the third best video of the 2010s, Billboard listed it 33rd on their list of the 100 best music videos of the decade, while Paste named it the sixth best music video of the decade.

Usage in other media
"Runaway" was used in the trailer for The Hangover Part III. The song was featured in a scene in The Night Before. A modified piano rendition by Ramin Djawadi, was used in a trailer for season 2 of Westworld, which premiered during Super Bowl LII.

The track was used in a Calvin Klein advert titled "Meet Our Women" for the fragrance Women, featuring actresses Lupita Nyong'o and Saoirse Ronan. The song served as the theme for the trailer of season 16 of Keeping up with the Kardashians. In 2012, the song was used in Bud Light Platinum commercial,  titled ‘Factory,’  which aired during Super Bowl XLVI.

The song’s drums would later be sampled in a song on West’s 11th studio album, with the song being titled True Love. 

PersonnelTechnical Andrew Dawson – recording
 Anthony Kilhoffer – recording, mixing
 Mike Dean – recording
 Christian Mochizuki – recording assistance
 Cary Clark – assistant mix engineeringMusicians'''
 Tony Williams – background vocals
 The-Dream – additional vocals
 Jeff Bhasker – keyboards
 Chris "Hitchcock" Chorney – cello

Charts

Weekly charts

Year-end charts

Certifications

Release history

References

External links
 

2010 singles
2010 songs
Kanye West songs
Song recordings produced by Kanye West
Songs written by Kanye West
Pusha T songs
Song recordings produced by Jeff Bhasker
Song recordings produced by Emile Haynie
Songs written by Jeff Bhasker
Songs written by Emile Haynie
Music videos directed by Kanye West
Roc-A-Fella Records singles
Songs written by Pusha T
Ballet films

fr:Runaway#Musique